Mollem (pronounced mole; the alphabet m is silent) or मोले is a small village in Goa, South India on National Highway 4 near the border with Karnataka in the foothills of the Sahyadri Mountain range at the beginning of Anmod Ghat. It comes under the Dharbandora block. It is the primary entry point for Bhagwan Mahaveer Sanctuary and Mollem National Park.

Geology
Some of the world's oldest rocks are found in this region and are classified as Trondjemeitic Gneiss with  Rubidium isotope dating estimating them to be at least 3,600 million years old.

References 

Villages in South Goa district